The 2021 ICC Men's T20 World Cup Final was a day/night Twenty20 International cricket match played at Dubai International Cricket Stadium in Dubai, UAE, on 14 November 2021 to determine the winner of the 2021 ICC Men's T20 World Cup. It was played between New Zealand and Australia, with both the teams yet to win their first T20 World Cup title. Australia won the match by 8 wickets to win their maiden T20 World Cup title.

Background
Originally, the preceding 2020 Men's T20 World Cup was scheduled to be held in Australia from 18 October to 15 November 2020,  but was postponed due to COVID-19 pandemic. Later, it was planned to be hosted by India as 2021 Men's T20 World Cup, with Australia being named as the host for the succeeding 2022 Men's T20 World Cup. In June 2021, the International Cricket Council (ICC) confirmed that the tournament was moved to UAE and Oman due to a possible third wave of the pandemic in India, with the Board of Control for Cricket in India (BCCI) would remain as the hosts of the tournament irrespective of the location. Eight teams played in the First round as two groups A and B, with top two teams from each group advanced to the Super 12 stage. Super 12 stage was played in two groups 1 and 2, with the top two teams from each Super 12 group advanced to the semi-finals. After finishing second in the Super 12 Group 2, New Zealand became the first team to reach the final, by winning the first semi-final against England by five wickets. With the second-place finish in Super 12 Group 1, Australia beat Pakistan by 5 wickets in the second semi-final to reach the final.

New Zealand's Devon Conway was ruled out of his country's team after breaking his hand during the semi-final match against England.

Road to the final

Match details

Match officials
Source:
 On-field Umpires:  Marais Erasmus and  Richard Kettleborough
 TV umpire:  Nitin Menon
 Match referee:  Ranjan Madugalle
 Reserve umpire:  Kumar Dharmasena

Scorecard

1st innings 

Fall of wickets: 1/28 (Mitchell, 3.5 ov), 2/76 (Guptill, 11.1 ov), 3/144 (Phillips, 17.2 ov), 4/148 (Williamson, 17.5 ov)

2nd innings 

Fall of wickets: 1/15 (Finch, 2.3 ov), 2/107 (Warner, 12.2 ov)

Match summary

New Zealand Innings

Put in to bat, New Zealand started off very well, with Daryl Mitchell and Martin Guptill scoring well against the Australian bowlers, helped along by a dropped catch from Matthew Wade. At 28 runs, Mitchell however, fell prey to Josh Hazelwood and was caught behind by Wade. Williamson then joined with Guptill and ensured Australia didn't pick any wickets until the 9th over. After a couple of boundaries to let loose, Williamson started scoring fast to keep up the run rate. In the 12th over, Zampa struck to remove Guptill, who was caught by Stoinis at deep mid-wicket for 28. Williamson then started scoring along with Glenn Phillips, targeting Marsh, Maxwell, and Starc for runs, the latter of which conceded the highest number of runs in a T20 World Cup final, giving away 60 runs in his four-over spell. Hazlewood struck again to remove Phillips and Williamson in the second and fifth ball of the 18th over, respectively. Neesham and Seifert scored at death overs to take New Zealand to a total of 172 for 4. Williamson top-scored for New Zealand with 85, equalling Marlon Samuel's record of 85* against England in 2016, in a T20 World Cup final.

Australian Innings

Chasing 173 to win, Australia suffered a setback when Aaron Finch was caught in the deep off Boult for 5 (7) during the third ball of the 3rd over. Mitchell Marsh and David Warner joined and started to build a solid partnership against the New Zealand bowling. In the second ball of the 13th over, Boult managed to bowl Warner out for 53 (38). This dismissal meant that Warner missed out on becoming the top scorer for the tournament, his 289 runs coming up behind Pakistan's Babar Azam's 303 runs. With 66 runs needed from 46 balls, Marsh was joined by Maxwell. Maxwell reverse hit Southee for the winning runs, winning their maiden T20 World Cup with 7 balls to spare. By doing so, Australia had scored the highest total in a T20 World Cup final, passing the score of 161 for 6 scored by the West Indies against England in the 2016 edition. Marsh was acknowledged as the player of the match, while Warner won the Player of the Tournament. This is the third time overall that New Zealand had failed to win an ICC limited overs tournament, having failed to do so in the 2015 World Cup (against Australia) and 2019 World Cup (against England).

References

ICC Men's T20 World Cup Finals
 
Sports competitions in Dubai
Cricket in Dubai